Roxanne Tataei, also known by the stage name Rox, is an English singer-songwriter from South London.

Early life
Born and raised in Norbury, London, England Roxanne Tataei's heritage is half-Jamaican (mother) and half-Iranian (father). She cites living with her grandparents and being a regular churchgoer as her introduction to singing.

By age 10, Tataei was a part of the National Youth Music Theatre and travelled across Britain appearing in various productions with them. By her 14th birthday she had her first guitar and was experimenting with several musical genres. She rehearsed her music at Scream Studios in Croydon.

Tataei's musical influences include Lauryn Hill, Joni Mitchell, Sade, Mary J. Blige and Alanis Morissette.

Music career
After forming her first band in 2007, Tataei attracted interest from a variety of labels before signing with Rough Trade in November 2008. Since signing, she has appeared on tours with the likes of Mark Ronson and Daniel Merriweather and on such television shows as Later... with Jools Holland (Series 35).

Tataei's debut single, "No Going Back", was released on seven-inch vinyl on 15 December 2009. She told Steve Lamacq on his Radio 2 show that the song is about "leaving a relationship and not wanting to go back to that situation."

Tataei's next single, "My Baby Left Me", was released on 15 March 2010 and made the BBC Radio 2 A-List and has received other critical success. She entered the Dutch Top 40 on 17 April 2010 at Number 35, moving to a new peak of 27 a week later.

Tataei released her debut album, Memoirs, on 7 June 2010, which features the previously released singles and 10 other tracks. The album was partially recorded in New Jersey in April 2009 with "Commissioner" Gordon Williams, but mainly in London with Jay-Z and Lupe Fiasco producer Al Shux.

Her third single, "I Don't Believe", was released at the same time as her album. The music video was posted by Tataei on her official Twitter on 4 May 2010. It was also used in an advertising campaign by Rimmel.

Her fourth single, "Rocksteady", was also included as soundtrack EA Sports game, 2010 FIFA World Cup South Africa.

Tataei's single 'My Baby Left Me' has been used in the 2013 movie Girl Most Likely as background music for the 'sex-scene' between Kristen Wiig and Darren Criss.

Reviews
Roxanne Tataei was tipped for success in 2010, being selected as HMV's "Next Big Thing" and in February played a headlining performance at London's Jazz Café on the "Next Big Thing Night".

Tataei was featured as The Guardian's "New Band of the Day" on 23 November 2009. She also made the longlist of the BBC's Sound of 2010. As well as MTV UK's "10 for 10" list.

Mike Driver, writing for the BBC about her debut album was effusive about the singer but complained about the inconsistency of the album overall, saying that it "showcases a young singer bursting with potential" but that "like many a debut, Memoirs doesn't know quite where to settle style-wise, veering from excellence to excruciation. Heart Ran Dry retains the acoustic element of the preceding Forever Always Wishing, but is more sketchy X Factor audition than a track worthy of making any album's final cut.".

Discography

As Rox

Studio albums

Singles

As Roxanne Tataei

Studio albums

EPs

Singles

References

External links

1988 births
Living people
Singers from London
English soul singers
English people of Iranian descent
English people of Jamaican descent
21st-century English women singers
21st-century English singers